King of the Dead is the second album by the American heavy metal band Cirith Ungol. It was self-produced by the band and released in July 1984 on Enigma Records. It was re-released in September 1999 on Metal Blade Records.

Band member Robert Garven declared in an interview:
"King of the Dead was our best album, the reason was that we had total control over it. Every album could have been this good if we could have exercised complete control over its production and other things. This is the album which I feel is our best effort. The reason the long wait between albums is because when you are financing them yourselves, you have to come up with the money to pay for things like studio time. Plus being on all these independent labels their time tables are slower. I also did all the layout and design of the first three covers, all this while we were all working full-time trying to sponsor the dream."

Guitarist Greg Lindstrom, who left the band in 1982, two years before the release of this album, said:
Atom Smasher,' 'Cirith Ungol' and 'Death of the Sun' were all songs we had written together in the mid 70's, and 'Finger of Scorn' was one of my songs that the band used with my blessing."

The cover of Michael Moorcock's novel "Bane of the Black Sword" acts as the album's cover: it is titled "King of the Dead" and was painted by Michael Whelan.

In 2019, Metal Hammer ranked it as the 14th-best power metal album of all time.

Track listing 
All songs written by Cirith Ungol, except where noted.
Side one
"Atom Smasher" (Cirith Ungol, Greg Lindstrom) – 4:12
"Black Machine" – 4:16
"Master of the Pit" – 7:09
"King of the Dead" – 6:49

Side two
"Death of the Sun" – 3:54
"Finger of Scorn" (Lindstrom) – 8:34
"Toccata in Dm" (Johann Sebastian Bach) – 4:37
"Cirith Ungol" (Cirith Ungol, Lindstrom) – 6:24

Remastered CD edition bonus track
"Last Laugh"  (live) – 4:22

Personnel 
Cirith Ungol
Tim Baker – vocals
Jerry Fogle – guitars
Michael ("Flint") Vujea – bass
Robert Garven – drums, percussion

Production
Tim Nelson – engineer
Chris Bellman – mastering at Allen Zentz Mastering, San Clemente, California

References 

1984 albums
Enigma Records albums
Cirith Ungol albums
Albums with cover art by Michael Whelan